Jemeil de Juan Rich (born January 31, 1975) is a retired American professional basketball player.

Pro career
After graduating from the Southern Methodist University in 1997, he was successful in international play, spending several seasons in Europe, including periods of time spent on teams in France, Switzerland, and Germany. He never got a chance to play in the NBA, although he participated in an Orlando Magic preseason game in 2004.

His performances in the Euroleague earned him a spot on the All-Euroleague Second Team in the Euroleague 2000-01 season, while he was playing for the Lugano Snakes.

Rich played for the Gary Steelheads of the Continental Basketball Association (CBA) from 2002 to 2005. He was selected as a member of the All-CBA Second Team in 2004 and 2005, and the All-Defensive Team in 2003 and 2004.

An explosive point guard, Rich ended his career playing for the Frankfurt Skyliners in the German Basketball Bundesliga.

References

External links 
Euroleague.net Profile
NBA.com Profile
D-League Stats
Italian Second Division Profile 

1975 births
Living people
African-American basketball players
American expatriate basketball people in France
American expatriate basketball people in Germany
American expatriate basketball people in Italy
American expatriate basketball people in Lithuania
American expatriate basketball people in Switzerland
American expatriate basketball people in Venezuela
American men's basketball players
ASVEL Basket players
Basket Napoli players
Basketball players from Gary, Indiana
Chorale Roanne Basket players
Fort Worth Flyers players
Junior college men's basketball players in the United States
Lugano Tigers players
Point guards
Sioux Falls Skyforce (CBA) players
Skyliners Frankfurt players
SMU Mustangs men's basketball players
Sutor Basket Montegranaro players
21st-century African-American sportspeople
20th-century African-American sportspeople